Gamini Kulawansa Lokuge (born 8 May 1943 in Piliyandala) is a Sri Lankan politician and a former Cabinet Minister.

Early life 
Lokuge was born on 8 May 1943 in Piliyandala to middle-class parents. He received his primary education in Piliyandala and completed his higher education at Piliyandala Central College.

Political career 
Lokuge entered politics in 1960 as a member of the United National Party (UNP). His first national campaign was in 1983, when he was elected by a clear majority to represent the Kesbewa Electoral District.

He served as Minister of Tourism in the UNP governments of 1989 and 2002. In 2006, he joined the government of President Mahinda Rajapaksa after having personal issues with Ranil Wickremesinghe.

In January 2007, Lokuge was appointed to the Ministry of Sports and Public Recreation. He was re-elected in 2010 and 2015.

On 27 November 2019 he was appointed as State Minister for Urban Development.

On 12 August 2020, he was appointed as the Cabinet Minister of Transport

Lokuge was appointed to the Legislative Standing Committee in February 2020.

Notes

References

Living people
Members of the 8th Parliament of Sri Lanka
Members of the 9th Parliament of Sri Lanka
Members of the 10th Parliament of Sri Lanka
Members of the 11th Parliament of Sri Lanka
Members of the 12th Parliament of Sri Lanka
Members of the 13th Parliament of Sri Lanka
Members of the 14th Parliament of Sri Lanka
Members of the 15th Parliament of Sri Lanka
Members of the 16th Parliament of Sri Lanka
Sri Lanka Podujana Peramuna politicians
1943 births
Labour ministers of Sri Lanka
United National Party politicians
United People's Freedom Alliance politicians
Sports ministers of Sri Lanka
Ministers of state of Sri Lanka
Alumni of Ananda Sastralaya, Kotte